Nadir Shah was an 18th-century ruler of Iran.

Nadir Shah may also refer to:

 Nadir Shah (umpire)
 Nadir Shah (cricketer)
 Nadir Shah (actor)
 Nadir Shah (Muslim saint)
 Mohammed Nadir Shah (1883-1933), King of Afghanistan